Allaberdy Berdyev (Russian: Аллаберды Бердыев; 1904 – 3 February 1964) was a Soviet Turkmen politician who served in various positions including Chairman of the Supreme Soviet of the Turkmen SSR and Chairman of the Presidium of the Supreme Soviet of the Turkmen SSR.

Early life and education 
Berdyev was born in 1904 in Bayram-Ali, Transcaspian Oblast of the Russian Empire. He worked as a laborer, a blacksmith's apprentice, and on a cotton field in the city of Bayram-Ali from 1918 to 1920. From September 1920 to October 1921, he was a private in the 1st Turkestan Volunteer Detachment of the Bukhara Red Army. He joined the All-Union Leninist Young Communist League (Komsomol) in 1922. From December 1923 to April 1928, he worked as a worker on his father's farm in Bayram-Ali. Berdyev worked as a windmill operator at the Ashgabat Silk Mill until 1929. He graduated from a university in Ashgabat in 1929.

Political career 
Berdyev joined the Communist Party of the Soviet Union in 1930. He served in minor positions in the Communist Party of Turkmenistan from 1931 to 1938. On 16 July 1938, Berdyev was elected as the Second Secretary of the Central Committee of the Communist Party of Turkmenistan and served in the position until 20 August 1940. He was elected as Chairman of the Supreme Soviet of the Turkmen SSR on 24 July 1938; just eight days after becoming the Second Secretary. After serving as Chairman of the Supreme Soviet of the Turkmen SSR, Berdyev was elected as the Chairman of the Presidium of the Supreme Soviet of the Turkmen SSR on 26 January 1942 and served in the position until 6 March 1948. From September 1950 to March 1953, Berdyev served as the First Deputy Chairman of the Executive Committee of the Surkhan-Darya Regional Council of Workers' Deputies in the Uzbek SSR. He was a member of the Council of Ministers of the Turkmen SSR later on.

Death 
Allaberdy Berdyev passed away on 3 February 1964 after suffering from an illness in Ashgabat, Turkmen SSR, Soviet Union.

Awards 

 Order of Lenin (four times)
 Order of the Patriotic War (first class)

See also 

 Supreme Soviet of the Turkmen SSR
 Bukharan People's Soviet Republic

References 

1904 births
1964 deaths
Recipients of the Order of Lenin